South of Sunset is an American crime drama television series that aired on CBS in 1993. The program starred Glenn Frey, Aries Spears, and Maria Pitillo and premiered on October 27, 1993. The premiere episode performed poorly in the ratings, causing the network to cancel the series shortly thereafter. Four additional episodes were produced but never aired on CBS; these would later be shown on VH1 years later.

Synopsis
Frey played Cody McMahon, former chief of security for a major motion picture studio who left his financially secure, yet unfulfilling job to become a private investigator. Cody's offices were located just south of Sunset Boulevard in Beverly Hills. As a result, he calls his business the Beverly Hills Detective Agency, despite the fact he's in the "low-end" part of town. Aries Spears co-starred as Cody's young assistant Ziggy Duane, and Maria Pitillo played his cute blond secretary (and aspiring actress) Gina Weston. The show was a combination of comedy and suspense, reminiscent of the series Moonlighting. The show was created by John Byrum, who wrote all six of the episodes that were produced, and served as co-executive producer with Stan Rogow.

Development
CBS had green-lighted South Of Sunset with a six episode buy. Pitillo became involved early on, in part because of her collaboration with the Rogow/Byrum team on the Middle Ages project. Spears was hired shortly after Pitillo, and both read with prospective actors auditioning for the part of Cody McMahon. After four months however, the producers still struggled to cast the male lead. It was only after Paramount execs saw Frey in concert, and recalled his previous acting experience, that they suggested him for the role of Cody McMahon.

Five of the seven scripts were produced. It remains unclear if Remember Me, and/or Chalk Lines were ever filmed.

Network run
The show was heavily promoted during the 1993 World Series by CBS. However, only the pilot of South of Sunset ever aired, and not even to the entire country. The October 27 premiere was pre-empted by several West Coast stations (including KCBS in Los Angeles itself) due to news coverage of wildfires in Malibu. (KCBS later aired the pilot the following Saturday, October 30 at 11:30pm.) Disappointed with the ratings of the pilot and unwilling to give it a chance to build a base, CBS immediately cancelled the show, much to Frey's chagrin.

Criticism
Delays in production pushed back the premiere date until October, and CBS came under criticism for choosing not to provide advance copies of the pilot to critics, leaving Rogow to comment after the cancelation:
"There was a perception we had something to hide, but we just didn't have the pilot ready," he said. "Forgive me, people in publicity, but how about trying the truth? Why not send the critics two other episodes we had finished and tell them the pilot was still being worked on? At least we would have been reviewed."

The network also came under fire from the production community, which was already unhappy with the networks new policy of purchasing shows in blocks of six instead of the usual eight, thirteen, or even a complete twenty-two episode season. CBS execs countered by saying that South of Sunset had almost no base audience to build on, and had negatively impacted the time-slot winner 48 Hours, which followed the premiere episode.

VH1 rebroadcast
VH1 later re-aired the pilot and four more episodes as part of their Eagles Family Tree Week.

Episode list
"Satyricon"
"Dream Girl"
"Custody"
"Family Affair"
"Newspaper Boy"
"Remember Me" (unaired)
"Chalk Lines" (unaired)

Cast

 Glenn Frey as Cody McMahon
 Maria Pitillo as Gina Weston
 Aries Spears as Ziggy Duane

References

External links 
Review: ‘South of Sunset Satyricon’. Variety. November 1, 1993 | 11:00PM PT
Former Eagle Glenn Frey Goes 'South Of Sunset. Ocala Star Banner-Google News Archive Oct 23, 1993
TELEVISION : He's Got a Peaceful TV Feeling : It's a new gig for ex-Eagle Glenn Frey. L.A. Times Oct 24, 1993
In the Dawn of 'Sunset's' Demise : Television: The CBS show starred a rock musician and got heavy promotion during the World Series, but still managed to join the ranks of an unenviable club.
Glenn Frey Online L.A. Times. Nov 13,1993
A TV Series Review by Michael Shonk: SOUTH OF SUNSET (1993).

CBS original programming
1990s American crime television series
Television series by CBS Studios
Television shows set in Los Angeles
VH1 original programming
English-language television shows
1993 American television series debuts
1993 American television series endings
Television series canceled after one episode